X Factor Adria is a Serbian version of The X Factor franchise. The first series started broadcasting in late October 2013. Even though the production is Serbian, auditions were held in Montenegro, Bosnia and Herzegovina and North Macedonia - making the series pan regional.
The series judging panel features Emina Jahović, Kristina Kovač, Kiki Lesendrić and Željko Joksimović. The auditions were hosted by Bane Jevtić with Sneže Velkov as a co-host. Una Senić hosted the spin-off series and co-hosted during the judges houses. After the first two episodes were aired it was rumored that Bane would be replaced by another host, but the producers denied it. On the night of the first live show it was announced that Bane would be replaced by Slavko Kalezić - actor and a contestant that was eliminated in the Judges Houses phase of the competition. Day after the first live show aired it was announced that Slavko would be replaced as well. On January 14, 2014, Ana Grubin revealed she will be new host, while Una Senić and Sneže Velkov report from the backstage.

Selection process

Auditions
Contestants were able to apply via text messages and an online form on the shows Facebook page. During the Exit Festival a mobile audition booth was set up and people could audition before previously applying. All of the applicants needed to preaudition for the producers before actually auditioning in front of the judges. The pre-auditions were held from August 20 to September 2 in Budva, Skopje, Banja Luka, Sarajevo, Niš, Novi Sad and Belgrade. After seeing all the acts, producers select a number of contestants that will audition in front of the judges.

From over 8000 acts that came to pre-auditions, producers selected 300 that were put through to judges auditions. The judges auditions are held solely in Šimanovci where the producers, RTV Pink, have their biggest studios. These auditions are the first part of the auditioning process that is broadcast to the public. The auditions were filmed in front of a live audience.

These are all of the contestants shown during the auditions episodes:

Key:
 – Contestant was eliminated

Judges weren't satisfied with Irma's first song leading to her getting only one "yes" (from Željko). She went backstage and thanks to Željko (and audience) she was called back to the stage when she received four "yes-es".

Bootcamp

Bootcamp is the second phase of the competition. There was only one 90 minute episode of bootcamp which was broadcast on December 10, 2013.
All the acts that got a yes during the auditions came back and judges chose 80 of them to perform again and sent all of the other acts back home without them singing again. The 80 acts performed in ten groups of eight, each group performing a medley or a mash-up selected by the producers. Judges originally decided on the 25 acts to progress to judges houses, six from each category, except for the groups, where seven acts progressed - three of the groups consist of the acts that had previously audition as soloists. Even though it was announced that Kristina would have seven acts at her house, Mouse Miles signed a contract with a recording company and had to leave the competition, therefore the groups category had six acts, like all of the other categories, making the total number of 24 contestants that advanced through to judges houses.

Key:
 – Contestant was eliminated
 – Contestant progressed to the Judges' houses
 – Contestant auditioned as a solo artist, but progressed to the Judges' houses in a group

The 24 acts that progressed to the judges houses:
Boys: Miloš Bajat, Haris Ćato, Lukijan Ivanović, Petar Jojić, Stefan Koković, Aleksa Perović
Girls: Aleksandra Brković, Katarina Jovanović, Ilma Karahmet, Tamara Milanović, Aleksandra Sekulić, Hristina Vuković 
Over 27s: Maid Hećimović, Daniel Kajmakoski, Slavko Kalezić, Mladen Lukić, Maja Novaković, Bojana Račić
Groups: Ivan & Kiko Radenov, Jana Vuković & Luka Grumić, Roma Sijam, 4U, Doktori, H2O

Judges' houses
At the end of Bootcamp, it was revealed that the boys category would be mentored by Jahović, the girls by Lesendrić, the over 27s by Joksimović and the groups would be mentored by Kovač.
Some information about the locations of the judges houses were leaked and published via various tabloids. It was revealed that Kiki was assisted by Scott Mills at his judges' houses, Emina by Mustafa Sandal and Joksimović by Tony Cetinski. Jahović took the boys to Istanbul for vocal coaching, but the performances and elimination were recorded in Belgrade.

Second chance
At the end of the first Judges' houses episode it was announced that the public would be given a chance to bring back a contestant that was eliminated and therefore did not make it to their respective judges' final three. After the votes have been cast and counted, four acts with the most votes from each category will come back on the first live show, after which only one of them would stay in the competition alongside other 12 contestants.
On the second live show it was announced that it was a close call between Maid Hećimović and Aleksandra Sekulić, so the producers decided to bring them both back.

Contestants

Key:
 – Winner
 – Runner-up
 – Third place

Live shows
The first live show episode was broadcast on 7 January 2014.

The Final
The final took place in Kombank Arena, Belgrade.

Result summary 
Colour key

 Joksimović was not required to vote as there already was a majority, but said he would have voted in Sekulić's favour in support of her future endeavours

Live show details

Week 1 (7 January)
Theme: Judges' choice
Group performance: "Za milion godina", "We Are the World"
Musical guest: 2Cellos ("Smooth Criminal" and "Smells Like Teen Spirit")

Judges' votes to eliminate
Lesendrić: Mladen Lukić – backed his own act, Aleksandra Brković
Joksimović: Aleksandra Brković – backed his own act, Mladen Lukić
Kovač: Mladen Lukić – gave no reason, said it was by instinct
Jahović: Aleksandra Brković – could not decide so chose to take it to deadlock

With the acts in the bottom two receiving two votes each, the result was deadlocked and reverted to the earlier public vote. Lukić was eliminated as the act with the fewest public votes.

Week 2 (14 January)
Theme: Love and heartbreak
Musical guest: Hari Varešanović ("Lejla" and "Baš ti lijepo stoje suze") and premiere of Emina's new single "Opet si sa njom"

Judges' votes to eliminate
Joksimović: 4U - backed his own act, Maja Novaković
Kovač: Maja Novaković - backed her own act, 4U
Lesendrić: Maja Novaković - gave no reason
Jahović: Maja Novaković - thought that 4U performed better, although she also thought neither act practiced enough

Week 3 (21 January)
Theme: Serbian, Bosnian, Macedonian, Croatian and Montenegrin songs
Musical guest: Jelena Tomašević ("Panta rei" and "Radio svira za nas")

Judges' votes to eliminate
Kovač: Aleksandra Sekulić - backed her own act, H2O
Lesendrić: H2O - backed his own act, Aleksandra Sekulić
Joksimović: H2O - claimed that Sekulić sang really well and went for "all or nothing" in the Sing-off
Jahović: H2O - said that Sekulić's performance in the Sing-off was her best one throughout the competition

Week 4 (28 January)
Theme: Contestants' choice
Musical guest: Jelena Rozga ("Nirvana" and "Cirkus") and Doris Dragović ("Marija Magdalena")

Judges' votes to eliminate
Lesendrić: Aleksandra Sekulić - both acts were in his category, but thought that Brković performed better
Kovač: Aleksandra Sekulić - said that Brković was better both in the Sing-Off and throughout the competition
Jahović: Aleksandra Sekulić - thought that both acts performed average and added that it is difficult to win a Sing-Off against Brković
Joksimović: did not need to vote as there already was a majority, however decided to give his vote to Sekulić in support of her future endeavours

Week 5 (4 February)
Theme: Dance night
Musical guest: Loreen ("My Heart Is Refusing Me" and "Euphoria")

Judges' votes to eliminate
Kovač: Haris Ćato - backed her own act, 4U
Jahović: 4U - backed her own act, Haris Ćato
Joksimović: 4U - said both acts were good but opted to keep Ćato in the competition
Lesendrić: Haris Ćato - could not decide so chose to take it to deadlock
With the acts in the bottom two receiving two votes each, the result was deadlocked and reverted to the earlier public vote.4U was eliminated as the act with the fewest public votes

Week 6 (18 February)
The sixth live show was scheduled to be broadcast on 11 February, but because a flu epidemic struck both contestants and the production crew, it was postponed for a week. Instead of the live show, the producer decided to broadcast the special, "Meet you favourite".
Theme: Ballads
Musical guest: Kaliopi ("Oprosti" and "Crno i belo")

Judges' votes to eliminate
Joksimović: Haris Ćato - wished the best of luck to both contestants in the future and chose to keep Ivanović in the competition
Lesendrić: Haris Ćato - said that he highly respects Ivanović's ability as a music arranger
Kovač: Lukijan Ivanović - decided to save Ćato, despite her opinion that he was perpetually guided down the wrong path by his mentor 
Jahović: Lukijan Ivanović - both acts were in her category and therefore could not decide and chose to take it to deadlock

With the acts in the bottom two receiving two votes each, the result was deadlocked and reverted to the earlier public vote. Cato was eliminated as the act with the fewest public votes.

Week 7 (25 February)
Theme: Songs from movies and TV shows
Musical guest: Dejan Cukić ("Prava ljubav") and Tropico Band ("Sreća")

After the voting lines were closed producers announced that they decided on eliminating two contestants this week. The act with the fewest votes would be eliminated without participating in the sing off, while second and third to last placed acts would sing for survival.

Judges' votes to eliminate
Jahović: Maid Hećimović - backed her own act, Aleksa Perović
Joksimović: Aleksa Perović - backed his own act, Maid Hećimović
Lesendrić: Maid Hećimović - said that he likes both acts, but decided to keep Perović
Kovač: Aleksa Perović - claimed she had to listen to her heart and send Perović home

Week 8 (4 March) 
Theme: Judges' songs
Musical guest: Parni Valjak ("Nakon svih godina" and "Samo da znaš"), Nataša Bekvalac ("Najgora"), Ana Stanić ("Ovaj dan") and Slavko Kalezić ("Krivac")

Judges' votes to eliminate
Joksimović: Ilma Karahmet - backed his own act, Maid Hećimović
Lesendrić: Maid Hećimović - backed his own act, Ilma Karahmet
Kovač: Ilma Karahmet - stated that Karahmet was still too young and that she doesn't feel emotion when Karahmet sings
Jahović: Ilma Karahmet - said that she "knows what it means to be 30 and not have a song of your own"

Final week (23 March) 
Musical guest: Marija Šerifović ("Ja volim svoj greh"), Tijana Dapčević ("To the sky"), Kiki Lesendrić & Piloti ("Kada sanjamo") and Madlick ("Hey,Yoko Ono" and "We are the future")

Reception

Controversy and criticism

LGBT discrimination accusations
When Fifi Janevska (assigned male at birth) stepped on stage during the auditions, she was asked by Kristina if she wanted to be referred to as male or female. After Fifi said that she wanted to be referred to as female, Željko asked how could he refer to her as female when "she is male". When Fifi's performance was over, all of the judges gave her a yes, except Željko who said he was shocked. When commenting on the performance, Željko refrained from using either male or female pronouns when talking to Fifi. Željko also added he was not conservative which prompted Kristina to ask him "You aren't?". When voting, before giving a no, Željko said: "I don't like it. But you sing good."
After the episode was broadcast, LGBT organisations were outraged and wanted Željko to apologize for the way he acted. Željko responded on Twitter that he doesn't think he did anything wrong and that everyone's entitled to their opinion. The producers have stated that there was no hate speech in the way Željko talked to Fifi.
The situation had minor coverage by websites outside the Adria region - including a community article on BuzzFeed and Huffington Post.

Aleksandra Brković's elimination
In week 7, when two acts were eliminated, production faced minor criticism from the public for eliminating Aleksandra Brković without giving her a chance to sing for survival. After the voting lines have been closed for that night, Ana Grubin said that two acts would leave the competition, instead of one, without previously announcing the change of the rules. When bottom three were revealed, Ana announced that Aleksandra had the fewest votes and would leave without singing again. When the other two acts performed and judges had to vote which one would stay, some of the judges commented that they thought it was not fair for Aleksandra to leave without being given a chance to fight for her place in the competition.
In the days that followed, a lot of Aleksandra's supporters said that their votes did not get through, or got through after the voting lines were closed. Joksimović also tweeted that he received a lot of complaints from people who had problems with voting that night. Soon after that producers had a press release where they stated there were no problems with the voting lines and that the double elimination was previously used in the British version of the show and was not a thing they made up.

Episodes

References 

Serbia
2013 Serbian television seasons
2014 Serbian television seasons